The Communist Party (or KP) was a Titoist political party  in Serbia.

History 
It was founded in Belgrade on 28 November 2010, after two smaller communist parties (the New Communist Party of Serbia (NKPS) and the Social Democrats from Novi Sad) united with a group of communists led by Josip Joška Broz. Its only president was Joška Broz (grandson of the former president of Yugoslavia and the SKJ, Josip Broz Tito) and the Secretary-General is Miroslav Jovanović.

The Communist Party competed in the 2012 parliamentary elections independently, receiving 28,977 votes or 0.74% of the popular vote, failing to enter parliament. A similar situation happened in the 2014 parliamentary elections when the Communist Party (in coalition with Montenegrin Party) received 6,388 votes or 0.18% of the popular vote and again failed to enter parliament. However, for the 2016 parliamentary elections, the Communist Party joined a coalition led by the Socialist Party of Serbia that received 413,770 votes or 10.95% of the popular vote and entered the Parliament of Serbia and also the Parliament of the Autonomous Province of Vojvodina.

In January 2022, it was announced that the Communist Party changed name to the Serbian Left, with Radoslav Milojičić being elected president.

Organization 
The head of the party is the President, next in the hierarchy is the Secretary-General and after him is the party's Central Committee. The party is split into committees led by committee secretaries and also into basic organizations led by commissioners.

Presidents

Electoral results

Parliamentary elections

References
Notes

Citations

External links 

Excerpt from the register of political parties, which includes the Communist Party
Video by the Communist Party
Speech of Joška Broz on 25 May

2010 establishments in Serbia
Anti-fascist organizations
Communist parties in Serbia
Far-left politics in Serbia
Political parties established in 2010
Political parties disestablished in 2022
Socialist parties in Serbia
Defunct political parties in Serbia